Isabelle Eberhardt: The Oblivion Seeker is a soundtrack album by the ambient composer Paul Schütze, released in 1994 through SDV Tonträger. The music was composed for the 1991 Australian film Isabelle Eberhardt directed by Ian Pringle.

Track listing

Personnel 
Paul Schütze – instruments, production
Jörg Willich – design

References

External links 
 

1994 soundtrack albums
Film soundtracks
Paul Schütze albums
Albums produced by Paul Schütze